The ventral posteromedial nucleus (VPM) is a nucleus of the thalamus.

Inputs and outputs
The VPM contains synapses between second and third order neurons from the anterior (ventral) trigeminothalamic tract and posterior (dorsal) trigeminothalamic tract. These neurons convey sensory information from the face and oral cavity. Third order neurons in the trigeminothalamic systems project to the postcentral gyrus.

The VPM also receives taste afferent information from the solitary tract and projects to the cortical gustatory area.

Subareas

VPMpc 
The parvicellular part of the ventroposterior medial nucleus (VPMpc) is argued by some as not an actually part of the VPM, because it does not project to the somatosensory cortex as the remainder of the VPM does, and therefore should be called the ventromedial nucleus (VMb) instead.

Sources 
 Kiernan, J., & Rajakumar, R. (2013). Barr's the human nervous system: an anatomical viewpoint. Lippincott Williams & Wilkins.

References

Additional images

Thalamus